Hong Kong competed under the name "Hong Kong, China" at the 2008 Summer Paralympics in Beijing, People's Republic of China. Hong Kong sent 21 athletes to compete in eight events at the Beijing Games.  Although Hong Kong's NPC was a separate member of the IPC, Hong Kong hosted the equestrian events.

Medalists

Sports

Athletics

Men

Women

Boccia

Equestrian

Powerlifting

Rowing

Shooting

Table tennis

Men

Women

Wheelchair fencing

Men

Women

See also
2008 Summer Paralympics
Hong Kong at the Paralympics
Hong Kong, China at the 2008 Summer Olympics

References

External links
Beijing 2008 Paralympic Games Official Site
International Paralympic Committee
Hong Kong Paralympic Committee and Sports Association for the Physically Disabled (A member agency of Sports Federation and Olympic Committee of Hong Kong, China)
Hong Kong medalists at the 2008 Paralympic Games

Nations at the 2008 Summer Paralympics
2008
Paralympics